Joan Bernard Armstrong (February 15, 1941 in New Orleans, Louisiana – June 9, 2018, same place) was an African-American judge

Armstrong was "the first woman elected to serve as a judge in Louisiana and first African-American to serve as chief judge of the state's Fourth Circuit Courts of Appeal."

References

https://www.findagrave.com/memorial/190599552/joan-armstrong

2018 deaths
African-American judges
Louisiana state court judges
20th-century American judges
20th-century American women judges
20th-century African-American women
20th-century African-American people
21st-century African-American people
21st-century African-American women
People from New Orleans
1941 births